Digimon Survive is a visual novel with tactical role-playing game elements developed by Hyde and published by Bandai Namco Entertainment for Nintendo Switch, PlayStation 4, Windows and Xbox One.

Announced in 2018, the game was originally developed on a much smaller budget compared to previous Digimon games. However, as development progressed, producer Kazumasa Habu realized that their original budget and smaller studio was inadequate to achieve his vision, resulting in the game being re-developed from scratch and switched to a different game engine. This, along with the impact of the COVID-19 pandemic, resulted in the game being delayed from a previously announced 2019 release date.

The game was released in Japan on July 28, 2022 for PlayStation 4 and Nintendo Switch then released Windows and Xbox One on the following day alongside worldwide in other territories. The game received mixed reviews from critics and fans.

Gameplay 
Digimon Survive is a visual novel with tactical role-playing elements. Player choices influence the direction of the story, including the Digimon's digivolution process. Multiple playthroughs can result in different paths and different digivolutions. The game features multiple endings and should wrong choices be made, characters will be killed. The game is split into multiple types of gameplay, such as "Drama Parts", "Search Action", "Free Action", and "Free Battle". During "Drama Parts" the game proceeds as a text adventure to tell the story. In "Search Actions", the player searches for a way to survive. In "Free Action", the player chooses where to go and whom to talk during a limited window of time. During "Free Battle", the player can enter certain areas to train their Digimon and collect items.

Plot 
Takuma Momozuka, Minoru Hinata, Aoi Shibuya, Saki Kimishima, Ryo Tominaga, Shuuji Kayama, Kaito Shinonome, Miu Shinonome, and others are on a historical studies extracurricular activities camp during spring break. On the second day Takuma, Minoru and Aoi visit a famous local temple to investigate the legend of the "Beast Gods" (Kemonogami) where a festival to celebrate them will take place. As they explore, they come across Koromon, then hear screaming. Koromon and the group run to the source and find their classmates being attacked by other Digimon. Koromon digivolves to Agumon and scares the Digimon away. It is at this point, that Takuma and the others discover they are in another world.

Development 
Digimon Survive was first announced in a July 2018 issue of the Japanese magazine V Jump for release on the PlayStation 4 and Nintendo Switch consoles. The western version was announced by Bandai Namco on YouTube through a trailer, with Xbox One and Steam being included in the platforms. On July 6, 2019, the game was delayed to 2020. On July 29, 2020, Toei Animation Europe stated Survive will release in Europe in January 2021; however, this was removed from their website on August 4. The official cinematic opening trailer for Digimon Survive was published on July 22, 2019. On October 8, 2020, game producer Kazumasa Habu stated on Twitter it was delayed again as the game system for Survive was being reviewed and they had to redo their schedule from scratch. On October 15, it was officially announced that the release date of the game was delayed to 2021 due to the COVID-19 pandemic as well as having changed the game's engine during Q2 2020, meaning they needed more time to work on the game. Bandai Namco promised an update on the game's status in Q2 2021. However this update never came, and there was no mention about the development of Digimon Survive during the E3 2021 as well. On July 28, 2021, Toei Animation stated the game would release either in the fiscal Q3 2022 or "beyond". Fiscal year 2022 ended on March 31, 2022 which meant they expected Digimon Survive to release either between October and December 2021 (Fiscal Q3 2022) or some time after that. On October 28, 2021, however, Bandai Namco announced that the game was officially delayed to 2022 and apologized for not providing an update earlier like they'd promised.

At Digimon Con, on February 27, 2022, it was confirmed that the developers had been changed at some point from Witchcraft. The official Digimon Survive website then changed the developers listed on the website to Hyde. On April 18, 2022, the game's Japanese release date was finally revealed as July 28, 2022. Two days later, the localized release date was announced as July 29.

In July 2022, shortly before the release of the game, Habu stated that they had changed the development studio as his original intention was to create the game with a small team on an indie game budget, rather than the budget a Digimon game would usually get, but as the project went on he realized this wasn't possible and had to switch to a bigger studio with a bigger budget to be able to achieve his vision for the game. He also stated he was lucky that the smaller studio (Witchcraft) hadn't used much budget as it allowed him to convince Bandai's stakeholders not to cancel the game. As Witchcraft were using a custom made engine that Hyde could not access, development of the game had to be restarted from scratch which caused the game's development time to double from two years to four years, with development switching from the custom engine to Unity.

Habu also stated that he used his prior work on the Summon Night franchise as inspiration for the game, as well as taking inspiration from the Utawarerumono franchise.

Reception 

Digimon Survive received "mixed or average" reviews for PlayStation 4 and Xbox One according to review aggregator Metacritic; the Windows and Nintendo Switch versions received "generally favorable" reviews. Trent Cannon of Nintendo Life gave the title 8 stars out of 10 and cited its dark themes and character dynamics as its major strengths, writing, "Digimon Survive is one of the best visual novels to come out so far this year, with plenty of heart and tension to carry you through to the final act." Push Squares Robert Ramsey felt that the character dynamics, intricate artwork, and intriguing story as its highlights but felt that its point-and-click-based exploration sections were "slow, but bearable at best — frustratingly tedious at worst" and felt that its combat was "stunted", writing, "It never branches out from the basics, with digivolution being the only aspect that adds genuine spice to proceedings." Kotaku felt that the game was paced poorly, criticizing its bland character archetypes, inconsistent character dynamics, pedantic decision making, and its heavy emphasis on visual novel-based gameplay, writing, "Playing Digimon Survive felt like reading over the shoulder of someone who's taking too long to turn the page." Reviewers of Japanese Famitsu magazine granted the game a 32 out of 40 total score based on individual reviews of 8, 8, 9, and 7. Noisy Pixel staff listed Survive as the best visual novel of 2022.

Sales 
In Japan, Digimon Survive opened below its predecessors' sales with 28,536 retail copies sold for the Nintendo Switch and 7,757 retail copies sold for the PlayStation 4 version, the second and twelfth best-selling retail game, respectively, during its first week of release. In two weeks, the game sold 35,480 copies for the Switch.

In the United States, Digimon Survive had a strong opening as the eighth best seller in 48 hours. In the United Kingdom, the game debuted at tenth on the overall best-selling physical chart. In Australia, the game started 3rd in digital and physical sales for its first week and 7th in New Zealand.

In Spain, the game debuted at fourth with 4,000 copies sold (75% on Nintendo Switch). In Germany, Digimon Survive on Playstation 4 and Nintendo Switch debuted at third and fourth in the physical sales charts for the respective consoles. In France, the game released exclusively in digital became the eleventh best-selling game on the Nintendo eShop and the fourteenth on Steam during its first week of release.

At its launch, Digimon Survive was the best-selling game globally on Steam, ahead of the videogame Stray; the third in 48 hours and the tenth best-seller during its first week of release, the game leaves the chart the following week. Digimon Survive was 15th on the European Nintendo eShop chart for July.

As of December 2, 2022, the game has sold over 500,000 units worldwide. This comes following multiple discounts in November 2022 that dropped its price.

Notes

References

External links 
 
 

Bandai Namco games
Digimon video games
Nintendo Switch games
PlayStation 4 games
Survival video games
Tactical role-playing video games
2022 video games
Video games developed in Japan
Video games postponed due to the COVID-19 pandemic
Video games set in 2020
Visual novels
Windows games
Xbox One games
Video games with alternate endings